The DPR Korea Football League (Chosŏn'gŭl: 조선민주주의인민공화국 축구 리그) is North Korea's association football league. It has a  first division DPR Korea Premier Football League, a second division DPR Korea Football League 2, and a third division DPR Korea Football League 3.

History 
Including football, all sports in North Korea were on an amateur basis, with competitions called Technical Innovation Contests (Chosŏn'gŭl: 기술혁신경기대회; Hanja: 技術革新競技大會)  being held several times a year In football, First Technical Innovation Contests was held In 1960.

The league was the subject of the 1978 sport drama called Centre Forward. The movie was directed by Kil-in Kim and Chong-song Pak and starred In-son Cha. 

In 2010, football's National Championship was renamed Top Class Football League or Highest Class Football League (Chosŏn'gŭl: 최상급축구련맹전; Hanja: 最上級蹴球聯盟戰).

October 2017, after which Highest Class Football League was replaced by the DPR Korea Premier Football League (Chosŏn'gŭl: 조선민주주의인민공화국 1부류축구련맹전; Hanja:  朝鮮民主主義人民共和國 一部流蹴球聯盟戰) held in the home-and-away round-robin system used in most other countries.

Structure 
In 1990 and 1991, South Korean Newspaper reported, DPR Korea Football League had 3 divisions and promotion and relegation system

In October 2016, South Korean Newspaper reported, AFC said "In 2017, North Korea have a plan to create a new football league system which operates 3 divisions."

Note: North Korea is reclusive and closed country so it is difficult to obtain the information about whole changes and current detailed league system information.

 Round-robin tournament competitions
 First Division: DPR Korea Premier Football League
 Second Division: DPR Korea balls League 2 (uncertain)
 Third Division: DPR Korea Football League 3 (uncertain)

 Elimination tournament competitions
 Hwaebul Cup
 DPR Korea Championship (In the past, Round-robin tournament competition)
 Mangyongdae Prize
 Paektusan Prize
 Pochonbo Torch Prize
 Osandok Prize

Clubs

DPR Korea Premier Football League clubs

DPR Korea Football League 2 clubs

DPR Korea Football League 3 clubs

References

External links
Football for the Peoples. North Korea
North Korea – List of Champions at RSSSF
North Korea – Real Soccer Name Teams
DPRK Premier Football League

 
1
Sports leagues established in 1960
1960 establishments in North Korea